Dundee Masonic Lodge No. 733 is a historic building built in 1902.  It was listed on the National Register of Historic Places in 2008. The building housed the Masonic lodge group and a Methodist church. The lodge group had 64 registered members in 1920. The U.S. Post Office issued a pictorial postmark for the "Dundee Masonic Lodge No. 733 Station" in 2008. The building is also referred to as the "Goat Building" due to the zinc weathervane goat at the top of the buildings spire.

References

Methodist churches in Kentucky
Masonic buildings in Kentucky
National Register of Historic Places in Ohio County, Kentucky
Buildings and structures completed in 1902
1902 establishments in Kentucky
Clubhouses on the National Register of Historic Places in Kentucky
Churches on the National Register of Historic Places in Kentucky
Goats in art